Bushes Island is an island on the New River at its confluence with the Greenbrier River between Bellepoint and Hinton in Summers County, West Virginia.

See also 
List of islands of West Virginia

River islands of West Virginia
Landforms of Summers County, West Virginia